Adam Beales (born 11 October 1999), known as Adam B, is a YouTuber, actor, and television host from Derry, Northern Ireland. He is a former co-presenter of the CBBC shows The Dog Ate My Homework and Blue Peter. Beales has over 3 million subscribers on YouTube and has collaborated with Disney.

Early life 
Beales was born on 11 October 1999 in Derry, Northern Ireland. He completed his schooling at St Columb's College.

Career 
At the age of 12, he started his channel Adam B (formerly known as TheNewAdamb99) on 29 July 2012. He started by filming all of his videos and editing them from his bedroom in his parents' house.

In 2017, he made a partnership with Disney.

In 2019, his channel reached over 2.7 million subscribers with a total of 300 million views.

He has appeared on BBC Radio, The Ryan Tubridy Show and was featured on VidCon London's first conference. In June 2019, he won the Youth 19 Champions Award. From 2019-20, he was the co-presenter in the seventh series of the CBBC show The Dog Ate My Homework.

On 1 September 2020, Beales was announced as the 40th Blue Peter presenter and would make his debut two days later.

On 17 June 2022, Beales announced that he would be leaving Blue Peter, with his last appearance on 15 July 2022.

On 13 October 2022, Adam published his first booked titled "Adam Wins The Internet" - it is a fictional story, about a young man called Adam who dreams of becoming a YouTuber, even though it looks like he will never achieve it. However one day he accepts a challenge to get one million subscribers in one year by the mysterious "Popularis Incrementum website" which leads to Adam getting to start his own YouTube career with very exciting adventures and results.

Personal life 
Beales is  gay. He came out in a video he uploaded on his YouTube channel titled "I'M GAY" on July 22 2022. He began dating his boyfriend Dominic in November 2021. 

He works with his mother Edelle and father Paul as video partners. Beales' younger brother Callum also has his own YouTube channel, Callum B. The family collectively share a YouTube channel, Family 4.

References

External links

YouTubers from Northern Ireland
21st-century male actors from Northern Ireland
People educated at St Columb's College
Male television actors from Northern Ireland
Prank YouTubers
Mass media people from Derry (city)
YouTube vloggers
Gaming YouTubers
DIY YouTubers
1999 births
Living people
Blue Peter presenters
Television presenters from Northern Ireland
Male actors from County Londonderry
Gay actors from Northern Ireland
LGBT YouTubers
21st-century LGBT people from Northern Ireland